Polly Morgan may refer to:

Polly Morgan (cinematographer), British cinematographer active since 2011
Polly Morgan (taxidermist) (born 1980), British artist who specializes in taxidermy